= Fraternity of Minstrels =

Organization of musicians in London

The Fraternity of Minstrels was an organisation of musicians in London established about 1350. It was for "ordinary non-court players". It did not negotiate terms and conditions for players, but established a common treasury for the purposes of mutual aid when members were in need.
